= Apsoda =

Town of ancient Bithynia

Coordinates: 40°12′52″N 30°44′45″E

Apsoda was a town of ancient Bithynia, inhabited in Byzantine times.

Its site is located south of Çatak, Asiatic Turkey.
